Endoplasmic reticulum protein 29 (ERp29) is a chaperone protein that in humans is encoded by the ERP29 gene.

Function 

ERp29 is a reticuloplasmin, a protein which resides in the lumen of the endoplasmic reticulum (ER). The protein shows sequence similarity to the protein disulfide-isomerase family. However, it lacks the thioredoxin motif characteristic of this family, suggesting that this protein does not function as a disulfide isomerase. The protein dimerizes and is thought to play a role in the processing of secretory proteins within the ER. Alternative splicing results in multiple transcript variants encoding different isoforms.

References

Further reading 

 
 
 
 
 
 
 
 
 
 
 
 
 
 
 

Molecular chaperones
Endoplasmic reticulum resident proteins